It's Only Ketchup is an album released by Tim Fite.  Like his previous release, Over the Counter Culture, the album was made available at Fite's website for free download.  However, the album was only available on October 31, 2007—the day of Halloween.  The album was, again, made available on October 31, 2008, along with a second Halloween-themed album, Ding-Dong DITCH!!!.

Musically, it is similar to Over the Counter Culture, eschewing the folk stylings of his studio albums and ending up as largely a hip hop album.

On the ANTI- website, Fite provides a humorous explanation of how the album came to be:

The song "Slash Rules" is similar to the song "C.R.E.A.M." by Wu-Tang Clan.

Track listing
All songs written by Tim Fite.

"Finders Keepers" (1:04)
"Slash Rules" (3:20)
"Trick or Treat" (3:19)
"We Look Good Together" (4:31)
"Get Up" (1:40)
"I Will Save Everything" (3:24)

2007 albums
Tim Fite albums
Albums free for download by copyright owner